James, Duke of Rothesay may refer to:

 James Stewart, Duke of Rothesay (21 February 1507 – 27 February 1508), the eldest son of James IV and his queen consort Margaret Tudor.
 James Stewart, Duke of Rothesay (22 May 1540 – 21 April 1541), the eldest son of James V and Mary of Guise, and nephew of his aforementioned namesake.